was an admiral in the Imperial Japanese Navy, and briefly served as Home Minister in the 1940s.

Biography
Suetsugu was born in Yamaguchi Prefecture as the younger son of a former samurai in the service of Tokuyama Domain. He graduated from the 27th class of the Imperial Japanese Naval Academy, ranked 50th out of 114 cadets. He served as a junior officer on several smaller craft, including a combat tour during the Russo-Japanese War on the gunboat . After the war, he attended the Naval Staff College where he specialized in naval artillery, graduating with honors from the class of 1909 with the rank of lieutenant commander.

After serving as chief gunnery officer on the battleship  and cruiser , he was assigned to the Imperial Japanese Navy General Staff Office. In 1914, he was sent to Great Britain as a naval attaché during World War I and was promoted to commander. He became a strong advocate on the increased use of submarines by the Imperial Japanese Navy, which he felt could be deployed to an advantage in an attrition strategy against the United States Navy provided that issues with long-distance operations could be overcome.

After his return to Japan in 1916, he served on the staff of the IJN 1st Fleet. In December 1918, Suetsugu was promoted to captain and was given command of the cruiser .

Suetsugu subsequently served on the Japanese delegation to the Washington Naval Treaty negotiations in 1921, although he was a prominent member of the Fleet Faction. During his period in staff assignments at the Imperial Japanese Navy General Staff, he worked on revisions to the Japanese battle plans and strategies, especially targeting the United States Navy, and to opposing the efforts of the Treaty Faction, especially after the signing of the London Naval Treaty. He was promoted to rear admiral in 1923 and vice admiral in 1927. In December 1931, he became commander of the Maizuru Naval District and in December 1932 became commander of the IJN 2nd Fleet. In 1933, he commanded the Combined Fleet and the IJN 1st Fleet. Suetsugu promoted rigorous training for the fleet, especially in severe weather conditions. He was promoted to full admiral in 1934, and became commander of the Yokosuka Naval District in December of the same year.

In December 1935, Suetsugu joined the Supreme War Council. He retired from active service in October 1937 and entered the reserves.

In December 1937, Suetsugu was named Home Minister under the first Konoe administration, serving in that post until January 1939. Noted for his extremely anti-leftist politics, Suetsugu immediately ordered the Tokko special police to begin widespread arrests of known left-wing individuals. He strongly supported Konoe’s plans for the creation of a single-party state under the Taisei Yokusankai. He was an outspoken advocate of the Tripartite Pact with Nazi Germany and Fascist Italy He was outspoken against those in the government and even those in the Imperial Japanese Army who were advocating a negotiated settlement to end the Second Sino-Japanese War.

He served as a Cabinet councilor under the Hiranuma administration from January to August 1939, and as a special advisor to the cabinet under the Koiso administration from October to the end of December 1944.

Suetsugu died in December 1944. His grave is at the Tama Cemetery in Fuchū, Tokyo.

References

Bibliography

External links

 Nishida Imperial Japanese Navy
 

1880 births
1944 deaths
Imperial Japanese Navy admirals
Military personnel from Yamaguchi Prefecture
Japanese military personnel of the Russo-Japanese War
Ministers of Home Affairs of Japan
Japanese military personnel of World War I
Japanese military personnel of World War II
Politicians from Yamaguchi Prefecture